Dr. Finian Tan is a venture capitalist, entrepreneur, and the founder and current chairman of Vickers Venture Partners, an international venture capital firm with a presence in Singapore, Shanghai, New York, Hong Kong, San Diego, San Francisco and Kuala Lumpur. Before he started Vickers, Tan was Managing Director and head of the Credit Suisse First Boston (“CSFB”) group of banks in Singapore and Malaysia, a role he took on after leaving his position as the Founding Partner and Managing Director of Silicon Valley venture capital firm Draper Fisher Jurvetson ePlanet for Asia, where he made an early investment in Chinese tech giant Baidu.

Prior to this, in 1997, Tan served as Deputy Secretary of the Ministry of Trade and Industry for the Singapore Government.

Some of Tan's other notable investments include out-of-home media company Focus Media, the Asian Food Channel, Kongzhong Corporation, TWG Tea, SunFun Info Co., gaming software company RTG Asia, RWDC Industries, Emergex Vaccines, and life science company Samumed.

Education 
Tan received his Doctor of Philosophy from Cambridge University on the Shell/Cambridge Scholarship. The Shell Scholarship is awarded competitively to the top 3 candidates from 11 commonwealth countries, and he was the first Singaporean recipient of the award. Tan was also concurrently on the Christ College Scholarship, an award given to the best college entrants of the year. He was also President of the Cambridge University Malayan and Singapore Society and represented Christ College, Cambridge in Squash. Additionally, Tan also worked full-time as the Assistant Director of Research in the Department of Engineering at Cambridge University.

He received his B.Sc. Degree in Engineering from the University of Glasgow, where he also won all the academic awards available for the examinations, including an award for being the top student for his course, as well as the most distinguished graduate award.

Career

Early career 
In the early part of his career, Tan worked with Shell Eastern Petroleum Ltd in Singapore and was later posted to Shell Japan Ltd, where he was promoted to Chief Trader. He then spent 3 years at Goldman Sachs as Vice President at J.Aron and Co (Singapore), before becoming the Regional Director and Head of J.Aron and Co. (Singapore) in charge of the Asia-Pacific Region.

Deputy Secretary of the Ministry of Trade and Industry 
In 1997, he returned to Singapore and was asked to serve as Deputy Secretary of the Ministry of Trade and Industry for the Singapore Government, with the aim of making Singapore a leading Asian country in innovation, creativity, and entrepreneurship.

Draper Fisher Jurvetson and Baidu investment 
In 2000, Tan became the Founding Partner and Managing Director of the Silicon Valley Venture Capital Firm Draper Fisher Jurvetson ePlanet for Asia. It was during his time here that he spearheaded the investment into Baidu. Tan saw Baidu's vast potential for success and invested US$7.5 million for 25% of the company, securing two board seats out of seven.

In August 2005, Baidu went public, by which time Draper Fisher Jurvetson Eplanet had 28.1%, more than Baidu Founder and CEO Robin Li’s 25.8%. Today, Baidu is worth US$62 billion and is considered the best performing IPO on Nasdaq.

In 2002, Tan joined as Managing Director and head of the Credit Suisse First Boston (“CSFB”) group of banks in Singapore and Malaysia. During his tenure as head of the CSFB group of banks in Singapore, Tan remained as chairman of DFJ ePlanet’s Asian investment committee and remained on the board of DFJ ePlanet (S) Ltd until 2009.

Vickers Venture Partners 
In 2005, Tan founded Vickers Venture Partners together with his co-founder Dr Khalil Binebine and 4 other co-founders, and is currently the Chairman of the investment committee. He is based in Singapore and travels frequently to the other cities in which Vickers has a presence; especially San Diego, California, where Samumed, the largest Vickers’ portfolio company, is based and for which Dr Binebine is the sponsor of the deal and Dr Tan the co-sponsor.

He sponsored/co-sponsored and played substantial roles in several of Vickers’ portfolio companies including Cambridge Industrial Trust Management (Chairman), Asia Food Channel (Founding Chairman), M-DAQ, Spark Systems (Chairman), Entomo (Chairman), Matchmove (Chairman), Sisaf (Co-Chairman), RWDC industries (Co-Chairman), Emergex (Chairman), Eavor (Deputy Chairman), Chooch (board member), Lumitron (board member) and TWG, the co-owner of TWG Tea (board member).

Government roles and positions (1997-2000) 
As Deputy Secretary of the Ministry of Trade and Industry in Singapore, Tan also served as Chairman of the US$1 billion TIF fund. In 1997, he was a member of the Economic Review Committee of Singapore. Other roles included being on the boards of:

 Defence Science and Technology Agency (Singapore) 
 SMA (Singapore-MIT) Governing Board 
 Singapore National Computer Board 
 National Science and Technology Board in Singapore (Deputy Chairman) 
 Life Sciences Investment Pte. Ltd. (Singapore) 
 The National Cancer Centre (Singapore) 
 Singhealth, the largest healthcare group in Singapore 
 Singapore Government Parliamentary Committee for Trade and Industry Resource Panel 
 Tuas Power Pte. Ltd (Singapore) 
 National University of Singapore Board of Trustees 
 The Singapore-Shandong Business Council 
 Sentosa Cove Pte. Ltd. (Singapore).

Government roles and positions (2000 and beyond) 
Tan continued to serve the country of Singapore after completing his term in the Singapore government. In 2002, he was part of the working group of the Economic Review Committee of Singapore. He was also on the board of:

 ST Electronics
 Media Development Authority of Singapore (Chairman Audit Committee and Investment Committee) 
 Singapore Polytechnic (also on Exco) 
 National University of Singapore Investment Committee 
 National Arts Council of Singapore (Chairman of the Investment Committee) 
 Majulah Connection (Singapore).

Other roles 
He has been a board member of numerous other Vickers portfolio companies:

 Mainspring Technology (Indonesia)  
 United Eagle Airlines (China)  
 Sunfun Info Co Ltd (listed in Taiwan)  
 Spicy Horse (China) 
 California Intercontinental University (USA, Chairman)
 Real Time Gaming Asia Pte Ltd (Singapore).

Other previous and current board appointments include:

 Singapore Venture Capital Association 
 Gabrielite Foundation in Singapore 
 W Residence Council (Singapore, Chairman) 
 Sentosa Cove Owners' Council (Singapore, Founding Chairman).

Philanthropy
In an interview, Tan shared his vision of giving away the family fortune for charity causes, saying "Africa is growing, but it is poor and education is weak. I would like to try my best to contribute.''

He has also expressed his vision to combat climate change, stating "We should at least leave the world unchanged, if not better".

As an active participant in Singapore's non-profit scene, he is the Founder and was the Founding Chairman of Bizworld Asia, a non-profit organization which volunteers to teach kids about business. In 2018, he also started a foundation with his wife called the Finian and Fiona Tan Foundation, which made their first million dollar commitment to the Wild Rice theatre in Singapore. Since then they have committed several other donations to the Music Theatre Factory in New York, Action for Dolphins in Australia, and Charity Water in New York.

References

Living people
Singapore Polytechnic alumni
Alumni of the University of Glasgow
Alumni of the University of Cambridge
Singaporean businesspeople
Year of birth missing (living people)